Blejești is a commune in Teleorman County, Muntenia, Romania. It is composed of three villages: Baciu, Blejești and Sericu.

References

Communes in Teleorman County
Localities in Muntenia